Machines (also known as Machines: Wired for War) is a 3D real-time strategy game released for Microsoft Windows. Published by Acclaim and developed by Charybdis. As a 3D game of this genre. Machines also allowed players to directly control units with both a first and third-person view.

Gameplay
Machines uses a 3D polygonal landscape, which players can use to their advantage, attacking from or hiding behind hilltops. The viewpoint can be switched between a default isometric, strategic 'zenith' camera, and first person perspective; the latter typically being used to explore buildings during espionage missions.

50 different machines can be researched and built, characterized by a plasma-based techtree and a projectile-based techtree combined with different methods of movement (Examples: 4 or 6 Spider legs, Wheels, Tracks, Hover-engines, Flying, 2 Legs). Furthermore, battalions can be developed with specific strengths to support a personalized fighting strategy. The game also includes 25 different weapons, including Flame-throwers, Vortex Singularities, Plasma Rifles, Mini-guns, Ion Cannons and Nukes.

Sabotage and espionage missions allow units to deposit mines inside enemy buildings, steal research, and pass back vital information.

Machines is multiplayer over a LAN or the internet.

Legacy
The game's source code was released by the new rights holder Nightdive Studios in October 2020. The source code is available under the GPLv3 license on GitHub. The game's assets are also available from the original developer's webpage.

Reception

The game received above-average reviews according to the review aggregation website GameRankings. GameSpot praised the impressive graphics and camera modes but highlighted the poor unit pathfinding and unoriginal gameplay. Steve Butts of IGN said, "I'm sold on the different views in the game. That alone makes it stand out enough to be noticed. In addition to that however, Machines is a pretty solid strategy game." Next Generation said, "At the end of the day, Machines doesn't really add anything to the RTS genre, but it's a well-crafted, solid game that's original enough to keep your attention for as long as it takes to beat the game."

References

External links
Official website

1999 video games
Acclaim Entertainment games
Commercial video games with freely available source code
Real-time strategy video games
Video games developed in the United Kingdom
Video games scored by Jim Croft
Windows games
Windows-only games
Multiplayer and single-player video games